The men's 110 metres hurdles event at the 2002 World Junior Championships in Athletics was held in Kingston, Jamaica, at National Stadium on 19, 20 and 21 July.  106.7 cm (3'6) (senior implement) hurdles were used.

Medalists

Results

Final
21 July
Wind: +2.6 m/s

Semifinals
20 July

Semifinal 1
Wind: +0.2 m/s

Semifinal 2
Wind: +0.5 m/s

Heats
19 July

Heat 1
Wind: -2.9 m/s

Heat 2
Wind: -1.5 m/s

Heat 3
Wind: -3.5 m/s

Heat 4
Wind: -1.7 m/s

Participation
According to an unofficial count, 29 athletes from 23 countries participated in the event.

References

110 metres hurdles
Sprint hurdles at the World Athletics U20 Championships